The Wynnum Manly District Cricket Club is a cricket club representing Wynnum, Queensland and Manly, Queensland, Australia. They have teams in the Brisbane Grade Cricket, Queensland Sub-Districts and The Warehouse Cricket competitions. They were founded in 1961. Wynnum also has a junior club that competes in the EDJCA (Eastern Districts Junior Cricket Association) and BEARs (Bayside, Easts and Redlands Junior Cricket Association).

List of First-class cricketers
Below is a partial list of Wynnum Manly players who have played at First-class level or above:
Bill Albury
Ryan Broad
Wayne Broad
Mark Gaskell

References

External links
 

Cricket clubs established in 1961
1961 establishments in Australia
Queensland District Cricket clubs
Wynnum, Queensland
Manly, Queensland